Adams Township is a township in Wapello County, Iowa, USA.

History
Adams Township was organized in 1844. It was named for Judge James F. Adams, a pioneer settler.

References

Townships in Wapello County, Iowa
Townships in Iowa
Populated places established in 1844